Jean-Marc Mazzonetto (Agen, 7 October 1983 – Gaillères, 9 January 2018) was a French rugby union player. His position was Wing or Fullback and he last played for Stade Montois (Mont-de-Marsan) in the Top 14.

Mazzonetto died in a road accident in Gaillères on 9 January 2018.  He was 34.

References

1983 births
2018 deaths
French rugby union players
Sportspeople from Agen
Stade Montois players
Rugby union wings